Ajay Bhatt (born 1 May 1961) is an Indian politician who is currently serving as the Minister of State in the Ministry of Defence and Ministry of Tourism in Second Modi ministry. He is also a Member of Parliament from Nainital-Udham Singh Nagar. He was State President of the Bharatiya Janata Party in Uttarakhand. Ajay Bhatt defeated former Chief Minister of Uttarakhand and Senior Indian National Congress leader Harish Rawat by a huge margin of 3,39,096 votes in Nainital-Udham Singh Nagar constituency in 2019 General Elections.

He has served as the Leader of the Opposition in Uttarakhand Legislative Assembly before state elections in 2017. He held several portfolios in the Government of Uttarakhand as a Minister. He is regarded as one of the senior most BJP leaders of Uttarakhand. He has also served as MLA from Ranikhet Legislative Assembly.
He has a nephew named Liladhar Bhatt who is unlike him in congress and Tarun Bhatt his other nephew also supports Ajay Bhatt.
Ajay Bhatt was known for the slogan "Sabki ek hi ratt..Ajay Bhatt..Ajay Bhatt" during Uttrakhand state elections in 2017.

References

Living people
Members of the Uttarakhand Legislative Assembly
State cabinet ministers of Uttarakhand
Leaders of the Opposition in Uttarakhand
Bharatiya Janata Party politicians from Uttarakhand
Lok Sabha members from Uttarakhand
India MPs 2019–present
1961 births